The 1989 Volvo U.S. National Indoor was a men's tennis tournament played on indoor hard courts at the Racquet Club of Memphis in Memphis, Tennessee in the United States that was part of the 1989 Nabisco Grand Prix. It was the 19th edition of the tournament was held from February 13 through February 19, 1989. Sixth-seeded Brad Gilbert won the singles title.

Finals

Singles

 Brad Gilbert defeated  Johan Kriek 6–2, 6–2 (Kriek retired)
 It was Gilbert's 1st title of the year and the 15th of his career.

Doubles

 Paul Annacone /  Christo van Rensburg defeated  Scott Davis /  Tim Wilkison 7–6, 6–7, 6–1
 It was Annacone's 1st title of the year and the 12th of his career. It was van Rensburg's 1st title of the year and the 12th of his career.

References

External links
 ITF tournament edition details

Volvo U.S. National Indoor
U.S. National Indoor Championships
Tennis in Tennessee
Volvo U.S. National Indoor
Volvo U.S. National Indoor
Volvo U.S. National Indoor